Kidada Ann Jones (born March 22, 1974) is an American actress, model, and fashion designer. Jones works as a designer for The Walt Disney Company, where she has a line known as Kidada for Disney Couture. Jones is the daughter of record producer Quincy Jones and actress Peggy Lipton.

Early life and education
The elder daughter of the marriage between composer/arranger Quincy Jones and actress Peggy Lipton, Jones was born in Los Angeles, California. She is Jewish on her mother's side, and African-American on her father's side. Lipton's parents were Harold Lipton, a corporate lawyer, and Rita Benson, an artist. 

Jones was raised in Bel-Air with her younger sister Rashida, who is an actress and screenwriter. After her parents divorced when she was eleven, Jones lived with her father and her sister lived with their mother. Jones attended the Los Angeles Fashion Institute for Design and Merchandising and left at age 19 to work with the designer Tommy Hilfiger.

Career
Kidada Jones began working as a celebrity stylist for her father's publication Vibe magazine. She gained attention when she styled pop star Michael Jackson for the cover of Vibe in 1995.  She was recruited by designer Tommy Hilfiger, who launched a successful ad campaign centered on Jones and a group of her friends (including Aaliyah, Tamia, Kate Hudson, Nicole Richie, and Oliver Hudson). She worked as his muse for eight years. Jones' fashion work included designing a clothing line for Snoop Dogg for three years. Jones also appeared during this period as a model in such fashion magazines as Elle, Vogue, and Harper's Bazaar.

Since 2005, Jones has been working with The Walt Disney Company, designing for Kidada for Disney Couture. W magazine described this as "a line of clothing and jewelry for adults sold at boutiques" and said that Jones acts "as a conduit to hip tastemakers the brand might otherwise miss". According to Jim Calhoun, Disney's executive vice president of consumer products, North America, "Kidada is not just one of those people that points out what's cool. She has a real hand in making things cool." She also consults on Disney projects.

In 2017, Jones published School of Awake, a book meant to empower young girls. Jones appeared on Oprah Winfrey's Super Soul Sunday.

Personal life
Jones dated rapper and actor LL Cool J from 1992 to 1994. In his autobiography, I Make My Own Rules, LL Cool J stated that he ended their relationship because they "didn't believe the same things". "She praised a guru and statues, and I praise God," he said.

Jones dated rapper and actor Tupac Shakur in 1996. She was at their Las Vegas hotel room when he was shot on September 7, 1996, and she was at the hospital with Shakur when he ultimately died from his injuries six days later. Jones dated actor Leonardo DiCaprio in 1999.

Jones had a close friendship with singer and actress Aaliyah who she met while modeling for Tommy Hilfiger.

She was married to Jeffrey Nash from 2003 until 2006.

References

External links

1974 births
Living people
20th-century African-American women
20th-century African-American people
20th-century American actresses
20th-century American Jews
21st-century American actresses
21st-century American Jews
21st-century African-American women
21st-century African-American people
Actresses from Los Angeles
African-American actresses
African-American fashion designers
African-American female models
African-American Jews
African-American models
American fashion designers
American television actresses
American film actresses
American women fashion designers
American people of Cameroonian descent
American people of Latvian-Jewish descent
American people of Russian-Jewish descent
American people of Tikar descent
American people of Welsh descent
Family of Quincy Jones
Female models from California